The Russian Party of Life (RPL) was a political party in Russia, led by Sergey Mironov (Speaker of the Federation Council, the upper house of the Russian parliament). According to its website, the party was liberal on economic issues and nationalistic on everything else. Its headquarters were located in Moscow.

In the legislative elections on 7 December 2003, the alliance of the Party of Russia's Rebirth and the Russian Party of Life party won only 1.9% of the popular vote and no seats, despite attracting to its list a number of Russian celebrities, most famously Oxana Fedorova.

The Russian Party of Life merged with Rodina and the Russian Pensioners' Party into a new party, A Just Russia, on 28 October 2006.

External links

Official party web site 
Energy of Life – Youth wing of Russian Party of Life

Defunct political parties in Russia
Political parties established in 2002
Political parties disestablished in 2006
A Just Russia
2002 establishments in Russia